Maletto is a comune (municipality) in the Metropolitan City of Catania in the Italian region Sicily, located about  east of Palermo and about  northwest of Catania.  

Maletto borders the following municipalities: Adrano, Belpasso, Biancavilla, Bronte, Castiglione di Sicilia, Nicolosi, Randazzo, Sant'Alfio, Zafferana Etnea. It is an enclave within Bronte and borders the other eight at one point at the top of Mount Etna.

References

External links
 Official website

Cities and towns in Sicily